An octagon barn is a barn built in an octagonal shape, see .

As a proper name,  Octagon Barn or  Octagonal Barn may refer to:

United States 
 San Luis Obispo Octagon Barn, San Luis Obispo, California
 Kinney Octagon Barn, Burr Oak, Iowa, listed on the U.S. NRHP
 Secrest Octagon Barn, Downey, Iowa, NRHP
 Fobes Octagon Barn, Lanesboro, Iowa, NRHP
 Octagon Barn, Otter Township, Milo, Iowa, NRHP
 Octagon Barn (Polk Township, Iowa), 
 Octagon Barn, Richland Township, Iowa, NRHP
 Roberts Octagon Barn, Sharon Center, Iowa, NRHP
 Grimes Octagon Barn, West Union, Iowa, NRHP
 Thumb Octagon Barn, Gagetown, Michigan
 Marsh Octagon Barn, NHRP in Wright County, Minnesota
 J. F. Roberts Octagonal Barn, Rea, Missouri, NRHP
 Octagonal Poultry House, Cold Spring, New Jersey, NRHP
 Lattin-Crandall Octagon Barn, Catherine, New York, NRHP
 Lunn-Musser Octagon Barn, Garrattsville, New York, NRHP
 Mexico Octagon Barn, Mexico, New York, NRHP
 Baker Octagon Barn, Richfield Springs, New York, NRHP
 Rodman Octagonal Barn, Edgeley, North Dakota, NRHP
 Gerhardt Octagonal Pig House, Gladstone, North Dakota, NRHP
 Sylvanus Marriage Octagonal Barn, New Rockford, North Dakota, NRHP
 James Wimer Octagonal Barn, Lookingglass, Oregon, NRHP
 Harnsberger Octagonal Barn, Grottoes, Virginia, NRHP
 Rankin Octagonal Barn, Silverton, West Virginia, NRHP
 Tim Thering Octagon Barn, Plain, Wisconsin

See also
List of octagonal buildings and structures in the United States
 Octagon Building (disambiguation)
 Octagon House (disambiguation)
 Polygonal Barn (disambiguation)